PriceSmart Foods is a chain of supermarkets located in British Columbia, Canada. It is a wholly owned subsidiary of the Overwaitea Food Group, which is owned by the Jim Pattison Group. PriceSmart shares the same brands and rewards card system as other Overwaitea chains, including Save-On-Foods.

In recent years all but two PriceSmart Foods locations have been converted into Save-On-Foods stores.

The two remaining locations, in Burnaby and Richmond  have adjusted their focus into specializing as Asian-foods supermarkets.

Locations 
2 locations:

See also 
List of Canadian supermarkets

References 

Supermarkets of Canada
Jim Pattison Group
Food and drink companies based in British Columbia